Wines Park is the name of a park in Lehi, Utah, in the United States. It was dedicated to Margaret Wines and is one city block square. It is located near North Center Street and 600 North in Lehi. It has four pavilions, a restroom, playgrounds, and many large, mature trees.

Parks in Utah
Protected areas of Utah County, Utah
Lehi, Utah